is a Japanese shōnen manga series written and illustrated by Isami Ishii. It was published from 1975 to 1985 in the magazine Weekly Shōnen Champion, owned by Akita Shoten, with a total of 50 volumes.

This manga was preceded by another work of the same author named 750 Rock, which was published between 1973 and 1974 in the magazine Weekly Shōnen Sunday, owned by Shogakukan. In 2001, two live actions were released, named 750 Rider and 750 Rider 2, which would later be released on DVD.

Synopsis
It depicts the interaction between Mitsu Hayakawa, a high school sophomore who loves riding his 750cc motorcycle Honda Dream CB750 FOUR, and his group of friends.

Reception
By 2014, the manga had over 20 million copies in circulation.

References 

1975 manga
Akita Shoten manga
Motorsports in anime and manga
Shōnen manga